Natalya Ivoninskaya (born 22 February 1985 in Astana) is a Kazakhstani hurdler. At the 2008 and 2012 Summer Olympics, she competed in the Women's 100 metres hurdles.

International competitions

References

External links
 

1985 births
Living people
Kazakhstani female hurdlers
Olympic athletes of Kazakhstan
Athletes (track and field) at the 2008 Summer Olympics
Athletes (track and field) at the 2012 Summer Olympics
Asian Games medalists in athletics (track and field)
Athletes (track and field) at the 2006 Asian Games
Athletes (track and field) at the 2010 Asian Games
World Athletics Championships athletes for Kazakhstan
Universiade medalists in athletics (track and field)
Asian Games silver medalists for Kazakhstan
Medalists at the 2010 Asian Games
Universiade silver medalists for Kazakhstan
Competitors at the 2005 Summer Universiade
Competitors at the 2007 Summer Universiade
Competitors at the 2009 Summer Universiade
Competitors at the 2013 Summer Universiade
Medalists at the 2011 Summer Universiade
20th-century Kazakhstani women
21st-century Kazakhstani women